Kiran Shiv Nadar is an Indian art collector and philanthropist. Kiran is the wife of Shiv Nadar, the founder of HCL Technologies, and is a trustee of the Shiv Nadar Foundation and the founder of the Kiran Nadar Museum of Art.

Personal life 
Kiran met her husband, Shiv Nadar, at an advertising agency where she worked. They have a daughter Roshni Nadar. Nadar is also one of the leading contract bridge players in India.

Career 
Nadar started her career in advertising as a communications and brands professional at MCM. Nadar then joined NIIT and helped shape the brand.

Currently, her roles include managing the SSN Trust, Public Health Foundation of India (PFHI), Rasaja Foundation and the Rajiv Gandhi Foundation to support young Muslim girls in their education in Uttar Pradesh.

Art collections and museum 
Nadar's fascination in collecting artworks began in 1988 when she was purchasing pieces for her home.

In 2005, Nadar decided to open her own museum To house her vast collection of art. "It used to pinch me that the bulk of my artworks were in storage when I really wanted to share them with the world at large," Nadar explains.
Today, the Kiran Nadar Museum of Art attracts over 100,000 visitors annually. According to Gaurav Bhatia, managing director of Sotheby's India, Nadar's museum has made "some incredible artwork accessible to common citizens". Bhatia also acclaimed that Nadar's collection is "a wonderful mix of instinct, study and enthusiasm".

Awards and accolades 
In 2010, Kiran Nadar is acknowledged by Forbes Asian Magazine as a "hero of philanthropy" thanks to her launch of India's first private philanthropic museum.

Nadar is considered the maharani of the Indian art world thanks to her collection of 5,500 and more modern Southern Asian arts. She is an international council member of the Museum of Modern Art (MoMA) in New York and is also one of the top commonwealth bridge players in India. She is also a member of the "Formidable" and has brought back many laurels. Nadar also represented India in various international competitive bridge events and managed to earn the gold medal for India after 12 years. Kiran Nadar won bronze from the Asian Games, but in February, she also brought India gold from the 5th Commonwealth Nations Bridge Championship held at the Gold Coast, Australia.

References

External links 
 Kiran Nadar Museum of Art
 Shiv Nadar Foundation
 Kiran Nadar Museum of Art at Google Cultural Institute

Living people
Indian art collectors
Indian philanthropists
1951 births
Bridge players at the 2018 Asian Games
Asian Games bronze medalists for India
Asian Games medalists in bridge
Medalists at the 2018 Asian Games
Women art collectors